Cinema Farhang is the most famous movie theater in Tehran and also in Iran. It is one of the official theatres that plays foreign films in Tehran.  It is located in the north of Tehran.

External links
 Official Website

Buildings and structures in Tehran
Cinemas in Iran
Tourist attractions in Tehran